Liu Yaju (born April 25, 1972) is a female Chinese softball player. She competed in the 1996 Summer Olympics.

In 1996, she won the silver medal as part of the Chinese team. She played seven matches as a pitcher.

External links
Liu Yaju's profile

1972 births
Living people
Chinese softball players
Olympic silver medalists for China
Olympic softball players of China
Softball players at the 1996 Summer Olympics
Medalists at the 1996 Summer Olympics
Olympic medalists in softball
Asian Games medalists in softball
Softball players at the 1994 Asian Games
Medalists at the 1994 Asian Games
Asian Games gold medalists for China